ASUE (Arbeitsgemeinschaft für Sparsamen und Umweltfreundlichen Energieverbrauch e. V.) -  The Association for the Efficient and Environmentally Friendly Use of Energy - is a German association founded in 1977.

The association's aim is to assist in the development and production of energy-saving and eco-friendly technologies. Its members include over 40 companies and corporations in the German gas industry.

External links

ASUE website

References 

Environmental organisations based in Germany
Energy organizations
Energy conservation in Germany